Maritime administrations, or flag state administrations, are the executive arms/state bodies of each government responsible for carrying out the shipping responsibilities of the state, and are tasked to administer national shipping and boating issues and laws within their territorial waters and for vessels flagged in that country, or that fall under their jurisdiction.

The main functions are:
Government policy for ships and boating, marine safety in general, seaworthiness, safe construction and stability 
Policing Dangerous goods being carried, Navigation safety, Safe manning, Certificates of Competency/licenses for crew
Health, safety and welfare of crew, civil search and rescue
Prevention and combating marine pollution and response, investigation of marine accidents
Represents country on IMO and other International Conventions

National maritime organisations 
Australian Maritime Safety Authority
Danish Maritime Safety Administration
Maritime Administration (North Korea)
Maritime Administration of Latvia
Maritime and Coastguard Agency, United Kingdom
Norwegian Maritime Authority
Swedish Maritime Administration
United States Coast Guard
United States Federal Maritime Commission
United States Maritime Administration
International Registries

See also
International Maritime Organization
European Maritime Safety Agency

References 

Maritime organizations
Water transport